Being Mortal is a cancelled American comedy-drama film written, directed, produced by, and starring Aziz Ansari in his would-be feature directorial debut. It was based on the 2014 non-fiction book Being Mortal by Atul Gawande. Bill Murray, Seth Rogen, and Keke Palmer were set to co-star. 

In April 2022, production was suspended due to a complaint against Murray for allegedly harassing a young female crew member. After more accusations surfaced against Murray in October 2022, followed by the departure of the film's cast and Ansari's failure to find a new distributor following the withdrawal of distributor Searchlight Pictures from the film, it was announced on February 27, 2023 that the film would not continue production.

Cast
 Aziz Ansari
 Bill Murray
 Seth Rogen
 Keke Palmer

Production
On February 22, 2022, Searchlight Pictures announced the development of an untitled film written, directed, and produced by Aziz Ansari in his feature directorial debut, with Ansari and Bill Murray attached to star. Taylor Friedman and Cameron Chidsey oversaw the film for Searchlight. Youree Henley was also a producer. In March, the title was revealed to be Being Mortal, the same as the material it is based on. In the following months, Seth Rogen and Keke Palmer joined the cast.

Suspension and cancellation
After principal photography began on March 28, 2022, Searchlight halted production on April 18 and officially suspended production on April 20 after investigating a complaint filed against Murray for "inappropriate behavior" a week prior. In a letter to the cast and crew, Searchlight said they were working with Ansari and Henley to resolve the matter and resume production. 

On April 30, Murray made a similar statement: "I did something I thought was funny, and it wasn't taken that way. The company, the movie studio, wanted to do the right thing, so they wanted to check it all out, investigate it, and so they stopped the production. But as of now, we're talking and we're trying to make peace with each other." In October of that year, reports emerged that Murray had allegedly straddled a "much younger" female production assistant and kissed her on the mouth, causing her to file an official complaint. 

Shortly afterward, Palmer told Variety that the film would need "a major rewrite" to be completed without Murray, but that "if somebody could figure it out, it's Aziz".

After more accusations surfaced against Murray in October 2022, followed by the departure of the film's cast and Ansari's failure to find a new distributor following the withdrawal of Searchlight Pictures from the film, it was announced on February 27, 2023 that the film would not continue production and thus has been officially cancelled.

References

External links
 

2020s unfinished films
Cancelled films
Unreleased American films
Films based on non-fiction books
Searchlight Pictures films
American comedy-drama films
2020s English-language films
2020s American films